Episake Kahatoka (born 14 May 1996) is a Fijian netball player who plays for Fiji in the positions of goal defense or goal keeper. She has featured in two World Cup tournaments representing Fiji in 2015 and in 2019. 

She also represented Fiji at the 2018 Commonwealth Games, her maiden appearance at a Commonwealth Games event.

References 

1996 births
Living people
Fijian netball players
Netball players at the 2018 Commonwealth Games
Commonwealth Games competitors for Fiji
2019 Netball World Cup players
Celtic Dragons players